2 in 8 with double base, which in Catalan is called  or , is a castellers human tower with 8 levels and 2 people per level in the trunk. It is strengthened by a second base ( in Catalan) in the second level, which helps the third level. The top crown consists of the pair, a bending child and the crowner. The last two members of the tower are the only ones that climb down through the opposite row they have used to climb up.

It is a very fragile human tower and it needs technical and equilibrated castellers to complete it. It is considered the third most difficult tower of 8 levels, after the 4 in 8 and the 3 in 8, and the first of the high range of 8, followed by the 7 in 8 and  5 in 8. Until 2014, 22 groups of castellers have attempted this tower and all of them have completed it.

It has been completed by Colla Vella dels Xiquets de Valls, Nens del Vendrell, Castellers de Vilafranca, Colla Joves Xiquets de Valls, Minyons de Terrassa, Colla Jove Xiquets de Tarragona, Xiquets de Reus, Xiquets de Tarragona, Castellers de Terrassa, Castellers de Barcelona, Bordegassos de Vilanova, Capgrossos de Mataró, Xics de Granollers, Xicots de Vilafranca, Sagals d'Osona, Castellers de Sants, Castellers de Lleida, Castellers de la Vila de Gràcia, Castellers de Sabadell, Castellers de Sant Cugat, Marrecs de Salt and Moixiganguers d'Igualada.

References

External links

Castellers
Catalan folklore